Thomas Henry Graham (20 July 1887 – 1967) was an English professional footballer who made one appearance in the Football League for Barnsley as a centre forward. He later played in the Midland League and Southern League for Castleford Town and Brentford respectively.

Career statistics

References

1887 births
English footballers
Brentford F.C. players
English Football League players
Southern Football League players
Footballers from South Shields
Association football forwards
Barnsley F.C. players
Castleford Town F.C. players
Midland Football League players
1967 deaths
Brentford F.C. wartime guest players